The 2015 American Athletic Conference women's soccer tournament is the third edition of the American Athletic Conference Women's Soccer Tournament. The tournament decided the American Athletic Conference champion and guaranteed representative into the 2015 NCAA Division I Women's Soccer Tournament.  The event is held at Westcott Field on the campus of SMU in Dallas, Texas.

Seeding and format
The teams are seeded based on their performance in the conference's round-robin regular season.  The top eight teams qualify for the event, with SMU and Houston not participating.

Bracket

References

 
American Athletic Conference Women's Soccer Tournament
American soccer tournament
Sports in the Dallas–Fort Worth metroplex